B. Devarajan was an Indian politician and former Member of Parliament elected from Tamil Nadu. He was elected to the Lok Sabha from Rasipuram constituency as an Indian National Congress candidate in the state general elections in 1977, 1980, 1984, 1989 and 1991.

References 

Indian National Congress politicians from Tamil Nadu
Living people
India MPs 1977–1979
India MPs 1980–1984
India MPs 1984–1989
India MPs 1989–1991
India MPs 1991–1996
Lok Sabha members from Tamil Nadu
People from Namakkal district
Year of birth missing (living people)